Los que no deben nacer ("Those who shouldn't be born") is a 1953 Mexican film. It stars Sara García.

Plot

A wealthy couple have a child that is born without both legs.    To shelter his wife from the pain of knowing that their only child had been born crippled,  he convinces their maid to trade the child she is expecting with his.  She agrees and out of greed and bitterness she sells the child to the circus.  The circus becomes the child's home where he grows up being exploited and exhibited as a human freak.

Cast

Anita Blanch
Jaime Calpe
Alejandro Ciangherotti
Isabela Corona
Sara García
Pituka de Foronda
Josefina Leiner
Fernando Luján
Rafael Montalvo
Álvaro Ortiz
Chula Prieto

References

External links
 

1953 films
1950s Spanish-language films
Mexican drama films
1953 drama films
Mexican black-and-white films
1950s Mexican films